Gobert de Helleville was a French nobleman from Helleville in Normandy, who was sent to the Mongols by the king Philip the Fair in 1288. Gobert accompanied the Mongol ambassador Rabban Bar Sauma on his return trip. 

Gobert is indirectly mentioned in the Syrian accounts describing Rabban Bar Sauma's voyage to Christians lands:
 

Gobert de Helleville departed on 2 February 1288 with two clercs, Robert de Senlis and Guillaume de Bruyères, as well as arbaletier Audin de Bourges. They joined Bar Sauma in Rome, and accompanied him to Persia.

Notes

References
"Histoires des Croisades III", Rene Grousset

13th-century French people 
Medieval French knights